The American School in Japan (ASIJ) is an international private day school located in the city of Chōfu, Tokyo, Japan.  The school consists of an elementary school, a middle school, and a high school, all located on the Chōfu campus.  There is also an early learning center (nursery-kindergarten) for children aged 3–5 located in the Roppongi Hills complex in downtown Tokyo.  Instruction is in English and follows an American-style curriculum. About two thirds of the school's students are the children of citizens of a wide variety of countries who are on temporary assignment in Japan, and the remaining one third are Japanese students who speak English.  The campus is fenced in, resulting from heightened security measures taken after the September 11 attacks, with campus surroundings including the Nogawa Park and the neighborhood of Tama. The Good Schools Guide International called ASIJ "an impressive school, not only for its size and facilities but also for its strong sense of where it is going."

History
Officially founded in 1902, The American School in Japan was started by a group of women who recognized the need for a school among the growing foreign community. Beginning life in rented rooms in the Kanda YMCA, the Tokyo School for Foreign Children, as it was then known, quickly attracted a growing numbers of students from around the world and soon needed to move to a more permanent home in Tsukiji. In 1921, the school moved to a new 3 story building in Shibaura. The building was deemed unsafe after the Great Kanto earthquake, and classes resumed on the Friends Mission compound in Shiba, in the former home of the Bowles family.

In the early 1920s Frank Lloyd Wright, who was in Tokyo building the Imperial Hotel, drew designs for a proposed new campus, as did Antonin Raymond. Although neither of the designs were constructed, Raymond assisted in the move and repurposing of some buildings when the school moved to Nakameguro in 1927. In 1933, local expatriate architect William Merrell Vories was asked to design and build a new main concrete building for the campus, which was completed in 1934. After closing during the war years, the school reopened in 1946. The current campus in Chofu was opened in 1963.

A series of major improvements to the main campus began in the late 1990s, with seismic updates, a new elementary school gym, and an expansion to the high school which included a redesigned entrance. A new cafeteria building with classrooms and administrative offices on the second and third floors opened in 2003. In 2004, the school's Early Learning Center opened in Roppongi Hills, moving from Nakameguro. A new theater complex opened in 2005. Between 2006 and 2009, athletic fields and playgrounds were upgraded and solar panels were installed. Between 2010 and 2013, a series of changes designed by Paul Tange addressed campus traffic flow, added new athletic facilities (including raised tennis courts with covered bus drop-off below, and replaced the Multipurpose Room, along with the Elementary music and art classrooms with the CADC (Creative Art Design Center) which not only houses the music and art classrooms, but also houses multiple rooms for the high school and middle school Design Technology classes, a Japanese Culture center, and holds multiple meeting rooms.

Jack Moyer sexual abuse
In March 2014, the school publicly announced that a teacher, Jack Moyer, had sexually abused students during his tenure from 1963~1988. He also continued to be involved in the school's 7th grade Miyake outdoor program until 2002, when the erupting island volcano ended that locale for the program. The school stated that the current administration and board had found out about this abuse in November 2013. However, victims of Moyer allege that past administrators were informed as far back as 1968. The school says that it has no record of this earlier reporting. Moyer committed suicide in 2004.  Alumni called on the school to commission an independent investigation into a possible years-long cover-up by the school's administration over the abuse allegations.  The school announced on 4 June 2014 that it had contracted the law firm Ropes & Gray to conduct an independent investigation into the allegations against Moyer and how ASIJ responded to the allegations.

In June 2015, the ASIJ Board of Directors released a letter admitting that an independent investigation found that Jack Moyer's abuse of students was extensive and that the abuse was covered up by faculty and administrators for years.  The board apologized for the harm this has caused and promised to release the report in English and Japanese by mid-June, 2015.  The full report, released by Ropes & Gray LLP on June 15, 2015, concluded "[i]n light of all of the evidence we have examined, it is apparent to us that Moyer was
a serial pedophile who, in our assessment, sexually abused female ASIJ students".  Lawyers for 13 of the victims also released their report on June 15, 2015.

Curriculum
ASIJ follows a broadly American curriculum and Advanced Placement courses are offered for high school sophomores, juniors and seniors.  There is a Japanese language program, which begins in the first grade. Other languages taught are Spanish and Chinese. All the students in the Elementary School must learn Japanese for one period every other day.

The Early Learning Center's philosophy is heavily influenced by the Reggio Emilia Approach and the curriculum is project based. The elementary school uses the Columbia Writing Program and Everyday Math program in addition to curriculum units developed by faculty.
In 2011, ASIJ joined Global Online Academy, a consortium of leading independent schools that offers courses taught by consortium member teachers to member school students. GOA courses are designed to give students an opportunity to offer their local perspective to global issues.

Environmental sustainability
SAFE, Student Action for the Environment, has been recycling paper for over a decade, approximately 20 tons last year. The school started keeping baseline data on energy usage and garbage volumes in 2007 when they began composting cafeteria waste and campus leaves using earthworms. The compost is used to fertilize the gardens and greenery around campus. Used cooking oil is donated to Revo International to produce biodiesel fuel.

Reflective paint on building roofs, reflective film on windows, the installation of more double pane windows and LED lighting were largely accomplished in 2008.  In 2009, with the help of government funding and private and corporate donors, the school installed solar panels on top of the gym and pool buildings which have a maximum capacity of 80 kWh.   ASIJ also promotes energy conservation each year by not turning on the heat or air-conditioning during October and April, aka NO HEAT-NO COOL months, and has reduced PET bottle consumption by promoting the use of water bottles such as SIGG and replaced regular PET bottles in vending machines with Coca-Cola's I Lohas bottles. Since the 2007–2008 school year, ASIJ has reduced annual energy consumption on campus by 25.1% with a goal of 30% by the end of 2013.

A 2010-2011 carbon footprint audit by ECO3 Design has given the school new goals to replace heavy-oil boilers and install a ground source heat exchange system.

Notable alumni

 Alev Alatlı, Turkish economist, columnist and bestselling novelist
 Thelma Aoyama, Japanese pop and R&B singer
 Agnes Chan, Japanese singer, television personality, university professor
 John Cornyn, American politician
 Bobak Ferdowsi, NASA flight engineer
 Norma Field, author
 Joan Fontaine, British-American actress
 Beate Sirota Gordon, American performing arts presenter and women's rights advocate
 Yu Hayami, Japanese singer
 Ernest Higa, entrepreneur
 Kaz Hirai, Japanese businessman
 Joi Ito, Japanese businessman
 Mizuko Ito, Japanese cultural anthropologist
 James M. Landis, American academic
 Lisa (Japanese musician, born 1974), Japanese singer
 Lois Lowry, American writer
 Daryl F. Mallett, American author, editor and publisher
 May J., Japanese singer
 Hikaru Nishida, Japanese singer
 Judy Ongg, Taiwanese-Japanese singer, actress, author, and woodblock-print artist
 Vladimir Ossipoff, American architect
 Rudolph Pariser, physical and polymer chemist
 Oliver Platt, Canadian-born American actor
 Linda Purl, American actress and singer
 Edwin O. Reischauer, American diplomat, educator, and professor at Harvard University
 Haru M. Reischauer, Japanese-American writer
 Frederik L. Schodt, American translator, interpreter and writer
 Steven Smith (astronaut), American astronaut
 Norman Tindale, Australian anthropologist, archaeologist, entomologist and ethnologist
 Oleg Troyanovsky, ambassador
 Hikaru Utada, Japanese-American pop singer
 Oswald Wynd, Scottish writer

See also
 List of Japanese international schools in the United States
 Americans in Japan

References

Further reading
  島沢 みどり. "アメリカンスク-ル・イン・ジャパン フレデリック・P・ハリス図書館を訪ねて." 学校図書館 (477), p68-71, 図巻頭2p, 1990–07. 全国学校図書館協議会. See profile at CiNii.

External links

 American School in Japan home page
 

American international schools in Japan
Educational institutions established in 1902
Elementary schools in Japan
Private schools in Tokyo
International schools in Tokyo
Japan–United States relations
1902 establishments in Japan
Chōfu, Tokyo